The Hundred of Bews is a hundred in the County of Chandos, South Australia, established in 1894.

The only towns in the hundred is Lameroo.

History
The traditional owners of the land are the Ngargad Australian Aboriginal tribes. The explorer Edward John Eyre passed through the area during his 1840-1841 travels.

References

Bews